Martin Alan Hatfull (born 7 June 1957) is a British former diplomat, now director of government relations at Diageo, and a board member of the UK India Business Council.

Hatfull was born on 7 June 1957, son of late Alan Frederick Hatfull, educated at Dulwich College and then Worcester College, Oxford (BA  1980).

He joined the Foreign and Commonwealth Office, 1980, and rose to become Minister to Japan, 2003–08, and Ambassador to Indonesia, 2008–11.

References
HATFULL, Martin Alan, Who's Who 2014, A & C Black, plc, 2014; online edn, Oxford University Press, Dec 2013

1957 births
Living people
People educated at Dulwich College
Alumni of Worcester College, Oxford
British diplomats in East Asia
Ambassadors of the United Kingdom to Indonesia
Diageo people